Battersea North was a parliamentary constituency in the then Metropolitan Borough of Battersea in South London. It returned one Member of Parliament (MP) to the House of Commons of the Parliament of the United Kingdom, elected by the first-past-the-post voting system.

It was created for the 1918 general election, when the former Battersea constituency was divided in two.  It was abolished for the 1983 general election, when it was reunited with most of Battersea South to form the new Battersea constituency.

Boundaries

1918–1950: The Metropolitan Borough of Battersea wards of Church, Latchmere, Nine Elms, and Park.

1950–1974: The Metropolitan Borough of Battersea wards of Church, Latchmere, Newtown, Nine Elms, Park, Queenstown, Vicarage, and Winstanley.

1974–1983: The London Borough of Wandsworth wards of Latchmere, Queenstown, St John's, St Mary's Park, and Shaftesbury.

The constituency was created by the Representation of the People Act 1918. When seats were redistributed by the Representation of the People Act 1948 the seat was redefined as consisting of five wards by the addition of the Winstanley ward, transferred from Battersea South. However the wards of the borough were redrawn in 1949 prior to the next general election in 1950. Accordingly, changes were made under the House of Commons (Redistribution of Seats) Act 1949. Of the 16 new wards, eight were included in each of the Battersea North and South constituencies.

In 1965 Battersea became part of the London Borough of Wandsworth. This, however made no immediate change to the parliamentary constituencies. It was not until the general election of February 1974 that the constituency boundaries were altered. St John's and Shaftesbury wards were transferred from Battersea South. These boundaries were used until abolition.

The constituency was abolished for the election of 1983, and was subsumed by the new Battersea seat, where it formed 61.5% of the total constituency (with the addition of Balham, Fairfield and Northcote wards from Battersea South).

Members of Parliament

Elections

Elections in the 1910s

Elections in the 1920s

Elections in the 1930s

Elections in the 1940s

Elections in the 1950s

Elections in the 1960s

Elections in the 1970s

References 

Parliamentary constituencies in London (historic)
Constituencies of the Parliament of the United Kingdom established in 1918
Politics of the London Borough of Wandsworth
History of the London Borough of Wandsworth
Constituencies of the Parliament of the United Kingdom disestablished in 1983
Battersea